The Sapinhoá oil field is an oil field located in the southern Brazilian Santos Basin,  off the coast of Rio de Janeiro in a water depth of . It was discovered in 2008 and originally named Guará field, under development by Petrobras. The oil field is operated by Petrobras and owned by Petrobras (45%) Repsol Sinopec Brazil (25%) and BG Group (30%).

Etymology 
The name Sapinhoá is derived from the Tupi language and refers to a marine mollusc.

Reservoir 
The field produces light oil and natural gas from the pre-salt Guaratiba Group reservoir rocks.

References 

Oil fields of Brazil
Santos Basin
Petrobras oil and gas fields
Tupi–Guarani languages